Anthony Cistaro (born June 8, 1963) is an American actor. At an early age he moved to San Francisco, California, where his father was a career counselor and instructor at City College of San Francisco. His mother was a homemaker. Cistaro attended St. Ignatius College Preparatory and graduated in 1981. He currently resides in the Canadian province of British Columbia.

Education and training 

He attended Loyola Marymount University in Los Angeles, California, and obtained a Bachelor of Arts-Double Major in French and Communication Arts, 1985. Additionally, he studied abroad at the American University of Paris.

In Los Angeles he studied acting technique with Stella Adler, going on to the Institute for Advanced Theatre Training at Harvard University, where he performed in over 17 productions and graduated with a Professional Certificate in Acting in 1997.

Roles

Film and TV
 All Day and a Night (2020) ... Detective Brown
 Sense8 (2016-2017) ... Agent Bendix
 "What Family Actually Means" (2017)
 "Polyphony" (2017)
 "Happy Fucking New Year." (2016)
 "Fell, Jumped or Pushed" (2016) ... Mike
 "Bare Knuckles" (2010) ... Donald Loften
 Charmed (2006) ... "Dumain"
 Witchblade (2000) ... "Kenneth Irons"
 Witchblade (2001–2002) ... "Kenneth Irons"
 The Runestone (1990) ... "Detective"
 The Method (1987) ... "Tony"

TV guest appearances
 Nip/Tuck (2009) ... Steven Ausbury 
 Ugly Betty (2008)...Twenty-Four Candles
 Friends (#10.18, 6/5/2004)...The Last One
 Angel: "I've Got You Under My Skin" (#1.14, 2/15/2000) ... "Ethros Demon"
 Angel: "Hero" (#1.9, 11/30/1999) ... "Trask"
 Thanks: "Tobacco" (#1.2, 8/9/1999) ... "Marcel Charmont"
 Alright Already ... "Mario":
 "Again With the White House" (#1.20, 5/4/1998)
 "Again With the Photos" (#1.19, 4/27/1998)
 "Again With the Hockey Player" (two parts: #1.15, 2/8/1998; #1.14, 2/1/1998)
 The Nanny: "Maggie the Model" (#1.12, 2/2/1994) ... "Carlo"
 Seinfeld: "The Masseuse" (#5.9, 11/18/1993) ... "Joel Rifkin"
 Cheers ... "Henri":
 "The Magnificent Six" (#11.4, 10/22/1992)
 "A Fine French Whine" (#10.10, 11/21/1991)
 "Home Malone" (#9.24, 4/25/1991)
 "It's A Wonderful Wife" (#9.19, 2/28/1991)
 "Woody Interruptus" (#9.11, 12/13/1990)

Other
 "The Tolls" (2017) ... Hans
 "Corporate Ladders" (2016) ... Roger
 Mafia: Definitive Edition (2020) ... Pilot (voice)
 Stone Landscape: Master of Illusions: Episode 1 (2006) ... "Vincente"

Notes

References
 Witchblade Interview
 Buffy and Angel Trivia Guide
 List of Credits

External links
 
 Official Site

1963 births
Living people
American male television actors
Loyola Marymount University alumni
Institute for Advanced Theater Training, Harvard University alumni
People from Kirksville, Missouri
Male actors from San Francisco
Male actors from Missouri
20th-century American male actors
21st-century American male actors